The Koralpe (or ), also referred to as Koralm, is a mountain range in southern Austria which separates eastern Carinthia from southern Styria. The southern parts of the range extend into Slovenia. Running from north to south, it drains to the river Lavant in the west, and to the river Sulm in the east. Its highest elevation (2,140 meters) is the Große Speikkogel, a popular hiking destination and also a node for military radar airspace surveillance. In the south, in the Slovenian territory, it is contiguous with the Kozjak mountain range.

The Koralpe consists mostly of metamorphic rock, of which some parts are of considerable interest to geologists and to collectors of semi-precious stones. In and around the Weinebene (also a popular recreational and  hiking area) there are pegmatites which contain significant amounts of spodumene, making this area the largest known lithium deposit in Europe. Quartz and feldspar, together with the dense forests, provided the basis for a glass and porcelain industry in earlier times.

The Koralm Railway currently under construction will link the provincial capitals of Klagenfurt and Graz via the Koralm Tunnel under the Koralpe by 2022.

References

External links

Mountain ranges of Carinthia (state)
Mountain ranges of Styria
Lavanttal Alps
Mountain ranges of Slovenia
Mountains of Styria (Slovenia)